Litocladius is a genus of chironomid midges that belongs to the subfamily Orthocladiinae and is composed of three species, Litocladius confusus Mendes et Andersen (2008), Litocladius mateusi Mendes, Andersen & Sæther (2004), and Litocladius floripa Mendes et Andersen (2008) all described from Brazil only. Male, female, and pupa of the type species (Litocladius mateusi) are described, the remaining two species are known only from the male adults. This species are known from the Atlantic Forest, along the Brazilian coastline.

The types/biological type of the only known species are housed in São Paulo, Brazil and Bergen, Norway.

The etymology of the genus is from the Greek "litos", meaning plain, simple, referring to the reduced pupa and the shape of the inferior volsella; "cladius" stands as a common ending among Orthocladiinae.

The only pupa recorded was found living among mosses on tree trunks; no data on the larvae are available so far.

References

Mendes, H.F., Andersen, T. & Sæther, O.A. (2004) A review of Antillocladius Sæther, 1981; Compterosmittia Sæther, 1981 and Litocladius new genus (Chironomidae, Orthocladiinae). Zootaxa 594, 1–82.
Mendes, H.F. & Andersen, T. (2008) A review of Antillocladius Sæther, 1981 and Litocladius Mendes, Andersen et Sæther, with the description of two new Neotropical genera (Diptera, Chironomidae, Orthocladiinae). Zootaxa 1887, 1–75.

Chironomidae